The Aysberg was a  in the Soviet Navy and later the Russian Navy.

Specifications 

Small missile ships of the Project 1234 according to NATO classification Nanuchka-class corvette is a series of Soviet small missile ships (MRK) of the 3rd rank built at shipyards of the USSR from 1967-1992.

The type consists of three series of subprojects:

 Project 1234, NATO code Nanuchka I
 Project 1234E, NATO code Nanuchka II
 Project 1234.1, NATO code Nanuchka III
 Project 1234.7, NATO code Nanuchka IV

By the name of the project code, the ships received the nickname gadflies in the navy. IRAs of Project 1234 were supplied to the Navy of four countries of the world: the USSR, Algeria, Libya and India. Libyan ones were destroyed during the NATO military operation in the summer of 2011; Indian ships of this project were withdrawn from the Indian Navy in 1999-2004.

The ships of the project were actively operated in all four fleets of the Soviet Navy and during the 1970-1980s carried out combat services in the World Ocean. They left a noticeable mark on the history of Soviet shipbuilding and are currently being gradually withdrawn from the combat strength of the Russian fleet. So, if at the beginning of 2001 in the Russian Navy there were 2 ships of project 1234 and 18 ships of Project 1234.1, then by 2006 all ships of project 1234 were withdrawn from the Navy and only 12 ships of the project remained in Project 1234.1 and 1 ship of Project 1234.7.

Construction and career 
Aysberg was laid down on 11 November 1976 at Almaz Shipyard, Leningrad. Launched on 20 April 1979 and commissioned into the Northern Fleet on 30 September 1979.

From 20 September 1989 to 14 November 1990, the Shipyard No. 82 at Roslyakovo underwent an average repair.

From 1994 to 2011, after the disbandment of 55 brk (m), it was part of the 108th Pechenga Red Banner Order of Ushakov, 1st degree, of the small missile ship division of the Kola Flotilla of heterogeneous forces of the Northern Fleet based in the Yekaterininskaya harbor (Polyarny).

From 9 January 1998 to December 2011, in the composition of 7 brnk (military unit 90829).

Since 2000, in the composition of 7 brkovr (military unit 90829).

Having celebrated its 40th anniversary in 2019, along with the Rassvet MRK of a later construction, it remained part of the constant readiness forces. The ship was reported to have decommissioned from service with the Northern Fleet in 2022.

Pennant numbers

Citations 

Ships built by Almaz Shipbuilding Company
1979 ships
Nanuchka-class corvettes